Sebastian Feyrer (born 4 March 1997) is an Austrian professional footballer who plays as a centre-back for SV Lafnitz.

Club career
He made his Austrian Football First League debut for Kapfenberger SV on 10 March 2017 in a game against WSG Wattens.

References

External links
 

1997 births
Living people
Austrian footballers
Austria youth international footballers
Association football defenders
Kapfenberger SV players
SC Austria Lustenau players
SV Lafnitz players
2. Liga (Austria) players